Blah, blah blah etc.  may refer to:

Music 
 Blah-Blah-Blah (Iggy Pop album), 1986, or its title song
 Blah Blah Blah (Blahzay Blahzay album), 1996
 Blah Blah Blah (EP), 2018 by Armin van Buuren or the title song
 Blah Blah (EP), a 2006 EP and song by Lady Sovereign
Blá Blá Blá, a 2004 album by Rouge
 Blah...Blah...Blah...Love Songs for the New Millennium, a 2004 album by Scum of the Earth
 "Blah Blah Blah" (Armin van Buuren song), 2018
 "Blah Blah Blah" (Gershwin song), 1931
 "Blah Blah Blah" (Kesha song), 2010
 "Blah Blah Blah" by Nicola Paone, 1959
 "Blah Blah Blah" by Todrick Hall from Straight Outta Oz
"Bla Bla Bla" (Gigi D'Agostino song), 1999
"Bla bla bla" (Priscilla song), 2002
"Blá Blá Blá" (song), by Rouge, 2004
 Blah Records, a British hip hop record label
 Blah Blah Blah (Itzy song), 2022

Film and television 
 Bla Bla, a 2011 National Film Board of Canada interactive animated film
 Blah Blah Blah (TV series), an Australian Broadcasting Corporation comedy TV series that starred Andrew Denton
 Blah Blah Blah, a 1995 short film written and directed by Julie Delpy
 Blah Blah, a character whose real name is not known, played by Abigail Spencer in "How I Met Everyone Else", a 2007 episode of US television series How I Met Your Mother

Politics 
 The Blah! Party, a political party in the United Kingdom aimed at attracting protest voters
 Moses Blah (1947–2013), president of Liberia from 11 August to 14 October 2003

Visual art
 Blah! Blah! Blah!, a painting series executed by Mel Bochner between 2008 and 2012

See also 
 Ramaria acrisiccescens, commonly known as blah coral
 BLA (disambiguation), for the acronym
 Blaa, a doughy, white bread bun particular to Waterford City and County Kilkenny, Ireland